Carpocoris pudicus is a species of shield bug in the family Pentatomidae.

Distribution
This species is widespread in most of central and southern Europe (Albania, Austria, Bulgaria, Croatia, Czech Republic, France, Germany, Greece, Italy, North Macedonia, Romania, Northwestern Russia, Slovakia, Slovenia, Switzerland, former Yugoslavia.

Habitat
This species inhabits sunny, hot and dry environments.

Description
The head of each paramere has a single tooth. The abdomen is usually narrower or has the same width than pronotum. The humeral angles of pronotum are rounded, with black spot. Scutellum is weakly convex, without depression. Side edges of the scutellum shows a sharp, deep groove in the middle. 

This species is very similar to Carpocoris mediterraneus, however it may be distinguished by blunt and non-pointed pronotum angles and by the pronotum and abdomen of the same width.

Biology
These shield bugs are polyphagous, they mainly feed on Apiaceae, Asteraceae and Poaceae species.

References 

 Rider D.A., 2004 - Family Pentatomidae - Catalogue of the Heteroptera of the Palaearctic Region

External links
 EOL
 Galerie-insecte
 Bebe-punaise
 Eu nomen

Pentatomidae
Hemiptera of Europe
Insects described in 1761
Taxa named by Nikolaus Poda von Neuhaus